All Day is an album by The Pietasters, released on August 21, 2007 on Indication Records. It includes material that the band had been writing for the previous three years.

Track listing
"Change My Ways" (Pezzimenti) – 2:54
"Don't Wanna Know" (Pezzimenti) – 3:34
"Late Night Call" (Pezzimenti) – 3:44
"Triflin'" (Pezzimenti) – 3:17
"Keep on Lyin'" (Pezzimenti) – 3:12
"Dream of You" (Jackson/Pezzimenti) – 3:49
"Anj Gil" (Pezzimenti) – 2:32
"Fozzy (Part 1)" (Jackson/Pezzimenti) – 3:28
"Listen to Her Heart" (Petty) – 3:12
"So Long" (Pezzimenti) – 2:31
"Ordinary" (Jackson/Pezzimenti) – 3:09
"Oolooloo" (Pezzimenti) – 2:43
"Sketch Dub" (Crandall) – 3:44
"G to F"  (Jackson/Pezzimenti) – 3:24
"All Day"  (Pezzimenti) - appears on Japanese edition 
"Concept"  (Blake) - appears on Japanese edition 
"Jasper's Fade"  (Pezzimenti) - appears on Japanese edition

Personnel
 Stephen Jackson - vocals
 Jorge Pezzimenti - bass guitar, guitar, keyboards, vocals, producer
 Toby Hansen - guitar, vocals
 Rob Steward - drums
 Alan Makranczy - saxophone, vocals, melodica
 Jeremy Roberts - trombone, vocals
 Carlos Linares - trumpet, vocals
 Todd Harris - producer, percussion, background vocals, engineer, mixing
 Jeb Crandall - keyboards
 Jeff Watkins - saxophone
 Tammy Harris - handclapping, laughs
 Sean Russell - engineer
 Seth Foster - mastering

References

2007 albums
The Pietasters albums